Bruno Bianchi (6 September 1955 – 2 December 2011) was a French cartoonist, comics artist and animation director. Bianchi worked extensively as an artist, director and producer on animated television productions; including Heathcliff, Iznogoud and most notably, Inspector Gadget, which he also co-created.

Career 
Bianchi started his career at DiC Audiovisuel (later DiC Entertainment) in 1977 at age 22 as a cel painter, then gradually assumed creative positions. His first director's credit was on the 1980 edutainment mini-series Archibald le Magichien (directly translated: Archibald the Magic Dog). In 1983, Bianchi scored his first major directing job on Inspector Gadget, a series he co-created with Andy Heyward and DiC's founder Jean Chalopin. Bianchi served as main character designer and supervising director on the show, which became one of the most iconic series produced by DiC.

Subsequently, Bianchi worked as a director, producer and designer on numerous other DiC Entertainment, Saban Entertainment and SIP Animation television animation productions from the 1980s until the mid-2000s. His credits include Heathcliff (where he co-created the Cats and Company characters together with Jean Chalopin), Jayce and the Wheeled Warriors, M.A.S.K., Rainbow Brite, Diplodos (which he co-created and co-wrote with Jean Chalopin), Iznogoud, Princess Sissi and Gadget & the Gadgetinis (a spinoff of Inspector Gadget).

In 2008, following the closure of SIP Animation, Bianchi founded his own studio, Ginkgo Animation. One of Ginkgo's projects had been George and Me (French title Georges et Moi), an adaptation of a 2006 Soleil Productions comic series that had first been picked up by SIP Animation as early as December 2007, and had been planned to start production at SIP at the beginning of 2009. However, by April 2011 this venture of Ginkgo's was considered unsuccessful due to changing priorities in the French animation industry, according to one of the authors of the original comics.

Bianchi died on 2 December 2011 at the age of 56. He was buried in Père Lachaise Cemetery in Paris on 6 December 2011.

Director
 1983: Inspector Gadget
 1984: Heathcliff
 1985: Jayce and the Wheeled Warriors
 1985: Rainbow Brite
 1985: Hulk Hogan's Rock 'n' Wrestling
 1985: M.A.S.K.
 1986: Popples
 1988: Diplodos
 1992: Around the World in Eighty Dreams
 1995: Space Strikers
 1995: Iznogoud
 1996: The Why Why? Family
 1997: Princess Sissi
 1998: Walter Melon
 1998: Jim Button
 2001: Wunschpunsch
 2002: Gadget & the Gadgetinis
 2004: The Tofus

Producer
 1995: Iznogoud
 1996: The Why Why? Family
 1997: Princess Sissi
 1998: Jim Button
 2001: Wunschpunsch
 2002: Gadget & the Gadgetinis
 2003: What's with Andy? (season 2 only)
 2004: The Tofus
 2004: W.I.T.C.H.
 2005: A.T.O.M. (Alpha Teens on Machines)
 2008: Combo Niños

References

External links
 
 Lambiek Comiclopedia article.

Date of birth unknown
1955 births
2011 deaths
French people of Italian descent
French animators
French animated film directors
French comics artists
French film directors
French male screenwriters
French television producers
Artists from Chartres
Artists from Paris
Writers from Paris
Burials at Père Lachaise Cemetery
Deaths from cancer in France
Year of birth uncertain